Katherine Tudor may refer to:
Katherine Woodville, Duchess of Bedford, wife of Jasper Tudor
Katherine Tudor, Princess of England, daughter of Henry VII of England and Elizabeth of York
Katheryn of Berain, Welsh noblewoman also known as Katherine Tudor
Katherine of Aragon, Queen of England and first wife of Henry Tudor (Henry VIII) and only wife of Arthur Tudor
Katherine Howard, Queen of England and fifth wife of Henry VIII
Katherine Parr, Queen of England and sixth wife of Henry VIII